Igor Žiković (born 28 December 1976 in Pula) is a retired Croatian footballer.

Žiković made a total of 20 appearances in the German 2. Fußball-Bundesliga during his playing career.

External links
 

1976 births
Living people
Sportspeople from Pula
Association football forwards
Croatian footballers
Croatia youth international footballers
NK Istra players
Tennis Borussia Berlin players
NK Olimpija Ljubljana (1945–2005) players
SV Wacker Burghausen players
NK Jadran Poreč players
Eintracht Braunschweig players
NK Istra 1961 players
2. Bundesliga players
First Football League (Croatia) players
Croatian expatriate footballers
Expatriate footballers in Germany
Croatian expatriate sportspeople in Germany
Expatriate footballers in Slovenia
Croatian expatriate sportspeople in Slovenia